Luba-Katanga, also known as Luba-Shaba and Kiluba, is a Bantu language (Zone L) of Central Africa. It is spoken mostly in the south-east area of the Democratic Republic of the Congo by the Luba people.

Kiluba is spoken in the area around Kabongo, Kamina, Luena, Lubudi, Malemba Nkulu, Mulongo, Kabalo and Kaniama,mostly in Katanga. Some 500 years ago or more, the Luba Kasai left Katanga and settled in the Kasai; since then, Luba Kasai (Chiluba) has evolved until it is no longer mutually intelligible with Luba Katanga.

Luba-Katanga alphabet

Luba-Katanga has 22 letters, 5 vowels and 17 consonants.

Vowels: A E I O U

Consonants: B D F G H J K L M N P S T V W Y Z

Phonology

Vowels 
A five vowel system with vowel length is present in Luba-Katanga:

Consonants 

 /p, b/ can have the allophones [ɸ, β] when in intervocalic positions or before a semivowel.

Sample text 
Sample text in Luba-Katanga Pādi palembwe amba mwingidi wa “Tattannu, muledi wa Bukila bwa Munonga” —ko kunena’mba i enka Tatenai utelelwe ne mu mukanda wa mu Bible wa Ezela.

References

External links
 Ethnologue report on Luba-Katanga

Luban languages